Schweinfurthia may refer to:
 Schweinfurthia (beetle), a genus of beetles in the family Tenebrionidae
 Schweinfurthia (plant), a genus of plants in the family Plantaginaceae